Patrick M. Gallivan (born November 18, 1960) is a member of the New York State Senate and the former Sheriff of Erie County. Gallivan's district, the 59th, comprises portions of Erie County, the entirety of Wyoming County, the northern half of Livingston County and the towns of Henrietta and Wheatland in Monroe County.

Biography
Gallivan was elected Sheriff of Erie County in 1998 and served through 2005.  Prior to being elected Sheriff, Patrick Gallivan served 15 years in the New York State Police, rising through the ranks from Trooper to Captain. Between his time as Sheriff and as a New York State Senator, Gallivan served as a commissioner on the state parole board.

After the retirement of incumbent senator Dale Volker, Gallivan defeated former Erie County Republican Party chairman James Domagalski and David DiPietro in a three-way Republican primary in September 2010, going on to defeat Democrat Cynthia Appleton and DiPietro (who continued to run on a line labeled "Tea") in the general election in November of the same year. In 2011, Gallivan voted against allowing same-sex marriage in New York during the senate roll-call vote on the Marriage Equality Act, which legally recognized same-sex marriages performed in the state, in a closely divided Senate vote of 33-29.

Personal
Gallivan lives in Elma, New York, with his wife, Mary Pat, and their two children, Jenna and Conor.

Gallivan's cousin, Pete Gallivan, is a reporter and anchor for Buffalo television station WGRZ.

Education
Patrick Gallivan holds a master's degree in Criminal Justice from the State University of New York at Albany and is a graduate of Canisius College in Buffalo.  He is a graduate of both the FBI National Executive Institute and the FBI National Academy, and is a past member of the New York State Executive Committee on Counter-Terrorism.

References

External links

Campaign Website

Republican Party New York (state) state senators
Sheriffs of Erie County, New York
People from Elma, New York
1960 births
Living people
21st-century American politicians